Pithecellobium is a genus of flowering plants in the family Fabaceae. The generic name is derived from the Greek words πίθηκος (pithêkos), meaning "ape" or "monkey," and ἐλλόβιον (ellobion), meaning "earring," which refers to the coiled shape of the fruit pods. Plants of the genus are known generally as blackbeads.

Species

There are about 75 species in the genus:

 Pithecellobium albicaule Britton & Rose
 Pithecellobium bahamense Northr.
 Pithecellobium benthamianum
 Pithecellobium bertolonii  Benth.
 Pithecellobium bifoliolatum
 Pithecellobium bijugatum
 Pithecellobium bipinnatum L.Rico
 Pithecellobium brevipes
 Pithecellobium brownii Standl.
 Pithecellobium caesalpinioides  
 Pithecellobium campechense  
 Pithecellobium candidum
 Pithecellobium circinale (L.)Benth.
 Pithecellobium cochliocarpum
 Pithecellobium concinnum Pittier
 Pithecellobium confertum Benth. also known as everfresh
 Pithecellobium cordifolium
 Pithecellobium cynodonticum Barneby & J.W.Grimes
 Pithecellobium decandrum
 Pithecellobium discolor
 Pithecellobium diversifolium
 Pithecellobium domingense
 Pithecellobium dulce  (Roxb.) Benth. – guamúchil, ebony blackbead, monkeypod (Mexico, Central America, northern South America)
 Pithecellobium elachistophyllum
 Pithecellobium elegans
 Pithecellobium excelsum (Kunth) Mart.
 Pithecellobium filipes (Vent.) Benth.
 Pithecellobium flavovirens
 Pithecellobium furcatum Benth.
 Pithecellobium glaucescens
 Pithecellobium guaraniticum 
 Pithecellobium guaricense
 Pithecellobium guatemalense 
 Pithecellobium gummiferum
 Pithecellobium halogenes 
 Pithecellobium hansemannii
 Pithecellobium histrix (A.Rich.) Benth.
 Pithecellobium hymenaeafolium (Willd.) Benth.
 Pithecellobium insigne Micheli
 Pithecellobium jiringa
 Pithecellobium johansenii Standl. (Belize, Guatemala, Honduras)
 Pithecellobium keyense Coker – Florida Keys blackbead
 Pithecellobium laetum
 Pithecellobium lanceolatum  
 Pithecellobium larensis
 Pithecellobium lentiscifolium
 Pithecellobium leucosericeum
 Pithecellobium longipendulum
 Pithecellobium macrandrium
 Pithecellobium maestrense
 Pithecellobium marthae 
 Pithecellobium mataybifolium 
 Pithecellobium micradenium
 Pithecellobium microchlamys
 Pithecellobium mucronatum
 Pithecellobium nicoyanum
 Pithecellobium obliquifoliolatum
 Pithecellobium oblongum Benth.
 Pithecellobium obovale
 Pithecellobium pachypus Pittier
 Pithecellobium peckii S.F.Blake
 Pithecellobium pistaciifolium
 Pithecellobium platycarpum Merr.
 Pithecellobium roseum – buche colorado
 Pithecellobium salutare
 Pithecellobium seleri Harms (Guatemala, Honduras)
 Pithecellobium spinulosum 
 Pithecellobium splendens
 Pithecellobium steyermarkii 
 Pithecellobium striolatum
 Pithecellobium tenue Craib
 Pithecellobium tonduzii  
 Pithecellobium tuerckheimii
 Pithecellobium unguis-cati (L.) Benth. – catclaw blackbead
 Pithecellobium velutinum
 Pithecellobium vietnamense I.C.Nielsen

Formerly placed here
Many species now in the genera Albizia and Abarema were formerly classified in Pithecellobium. Other species previously included:

 Archidendron bigeminum (as P. bigeminum, P. gracile, P. nicobaricum)
 Chloroleucon foliolosum (as P. foliolosum, P. grisebachianum, P. myriophyllum Malme, P. oligandrum)
 Pseudosamanea cubana (as P. bacona)
 Zygia cognata (as P. cognatum, P. stevensonii)
 Zygia pithecolobioides (as P. pithecolobioides, P. reductum)

References

 
Fabaceae genera
Taxonomy articles created by Polbot